The 13th Dallas–Fort Worth Film Critics Association Awards, given by the Dallas-Fort Worth Film Critics Association on 17 December 2007, honored the best in film for 2007.

Top 10 films
 No Country for Old Men (Academy Award for Best Picture)
 Juno
 There Will Be Blood
 Atonement
 Michael Clayton
 Into the Wild
 The Diving Bell and the Butterfly (Le scaphandre et le papillon)
 The Kite Runner
 The Assassination of Jesse James by the Coward Robert Ford
 Charlie Wilson's War

Winners

Best Actor: 
Daniel Day-Lewis – There Will Be Blood 
Best Actress: 
Julie Christie – Away from Her
Best Animated Film:
Ratatouille
Best Cinematography: 
The Assassination of Jesse James by the Coward Robert Ford – Roger Deakins
Best Director: 
Joel Coen and Ethan Coen – No Country for Old Men
Best Documentary Film: 
The King of Kong: A Fistful of Quarters
Best Film: 
No Country for Old Men
Best Foreign Language Film: 
The Diving Bell and the Butterfly (Le scaphandre et le papillon) • France
Best Screenplay:
Juno – Diablo Cody
Best Supporting Actor: 
Javier Bardem – No Country for Old Men
Best Supporting Actress:
Tilda Swinton – Michael Clayton

References

External links
 Dallas-Fort Worth Film Critics Association official website

2007
2007 film awards